Acleris negundana, the speckled acleris moth, is a species of moth of the family Tortricidae. It is found in North America, where it has been recorded from the District of Columbia, Georgia, Illinois, Indiana, Kentucky, Maine, Manitoba, Maryland, Massachusetts, Minnesota, Mississippi, Missouri, Ohio, Ontario, Virginia, West Virginia and Wisconsin.

The wingspan is 16–17 mm. Adults have been recorded on wing nearly year round.

The larvae feed on Acer negundo.

References

Moths described in 1940
negundana
Moths of North America